Marstonia is a genus of freshwater snails with a gill and an operculum, aquatic gastropod mollusks in the family Hydrobiidae.

Distribution 
Species in the genus Marstonia are distributed in springs, streams and lakes in eastern North America. Most of these species have extremely narrow geographic ranges and consequently have become a focus of conservation activities; two are federally listed as endangered and others are variously listed by state wildlife agencies.

Description 
The freshwater gastropod genus Marstonia is composed of 15 small (shell height < 5.0 mm), ovate- to elongate-shelled species. Marstonia differs from the other eight North American nymphophiline genera in that the (female) oviduct and bursal duct join well in front of (instead of behind) the posterior wall of the pallial cavity. It has also been resolved as a well supported sub-clade within its subfamily based on mtDNA sequences.

Species 
Eastern North American species of Pyrgulopsis are considered to be in separate genus Marstonia according to Thompson & Hershler (2002).

 Marstonia agarhecta (F. G. Thompson, 1969) - synonym: Pyrgulopsis agarhecta F. G. Thompson, 1969 - Ocmulgee marstonia
 Marstonia arga  - F. G. Thompson, 1977 - synonym: Pyrgulopsis arga (F. G. Thompson, 1977) - ghost marstonia
 Marstonia castor F. G. Thompson, 1977 - synonym: Pyrgulopsis castor (F. G. Thompson, 1977) - beaverpond marstonia
 Marstonia halcyon F. G. Thompson, 1977 - synonym: Pyrgulopsis halcyon (F. G. Thompson, 1977) - halcyon marstonia
 Marstonia hershleri (F. G. Thompson, 1995) - synonym: Pyrgulopsis hershleri F. G. Thompson, 1995 - Coosa pyrg
 Marstonia letsoni (Walker, 1901) - synonym: Pyrgulopsis letsoni (Walker, 1901) - gravel pyrg
 Marstonia lustrica (Pilsbry, 1890) - synonym: Pyrgulopsis lustrica (Pilsbry, 1890) - boreal marstonia
 Marstonia ogmorhaphe (F. G. Thompson, 1977) - synonym: Pyrgulopsis ogmoraphe (F. G. Thompson, 1977) - royal springsnail
 Marstonia olivacea (Pilsbry, 1895) - synonym: Pyrgulopsis olivacea (Pilsbry, 1895) - olive marstonia, it may be extinct
 Marstonia ozarkensis (Hinkley, 1915) - synonym: Pyrgulopsis ozarkensis Hinkley, 1915 - Ozark pyrg, it may be extinct
 Marstonia pachyta F. G. Thompson, 1977 - synonym: Pyrgulopsis pachyta (F. G. Thompson, 1977) - armored marstonia
 Marstonia scalariformis (Wolf, 1869) - synonym: Pyrgulopsis scalariformis (Wolf, 1869) - moss pyrg

Other species of Marstonia include:
 Marstonia angulobasis  F. G. Thompson, 2005 - Angled Marstonia
 Marstonia comalensis (Pilsbry & Ferriss, 1906) - Comal Siltsnail
 Marstonia gaddisorum F. G. Thompson, 2004 - Gaddis Marstonia

Although Marstonia has been reviewed four times since 1978 (Thompson 1978, Hershler 1994, Thompson & Hershler 2002, Hershler & Liu 2011), three of its congeners have been little studied beyond their original descriptions and their anatomy is unknown. Two of these — Marstonia olivacea, Marstonia ozarkensis — may be extinct and thus will likely remain incertae sedis.

References 
This article incorporates CC-BY-3.0 text from the reference

Further reading 
 Thompson F. G. & Hershler R. (2002). "Two genera of North American freshwater snails: Marstonia Baker, 1926, resurrected to generic status, and Floridobia, new genus (Prosobranchia: Hydrobiidae: Nymphophilinae)." The Veliger 45(3): 269-271.

Hydrobiidae